Events from the year 1574 in India.

Events
 Bharmal's rule of Amber which started in 1548, comes to an end with his death and Bhagwant Das succeeds him

Births

Deaths
 January 27 – Bharmal, Kachwaha ruler of Amber  dies (born c 1491)
 September 1 – Guru Amar Das, 3rd Sikh guru

See also

 Timeline of Indian history

 
India